Comarca de Loja is a comarca in the province of Granada, Spain. It contains the following municipalities:

 Algarinejo
 Huétor-Tájar
 Íllora
 Loja
 Moclín
 Montefrío
 Moraleda de Zafayona
 Salar
 Villanueva Mesía
 Zagra

References 

Comarcas of the Province of Granada